This is a list of educational and research institutions in Hyderabad, Telangana, India.

Universities and central institutions 
 Osmania University
 Indian Institute of Technology Hyderabad

 Tata Institute of Fundamental Research
 Birla Institute of Technology and Science, Pilani
 English and Foreign Languages University

 International Institute of Information Technology, Hyderabad
 Jawaharlal Nehru Technological University
 NALSAR University of Law
 Professor Jayashankar Telangana State Agricultural University
 Dr. B.R. Ambedkar Open University
 Tata Institute of Social Sciences, Hyderabad
 Indian School of Business
 Woxsen School of Business
 Maulana Azad National Urdu University
 NMIMS, Hyderabad
 GITAM University Hyderabad Campus
 Potti Sreeramulu Telugu University
 Institute of Chartered Financial Analysts of India
 Mahindra Ecole Centrale
 University of Hyderabad

Centres and institutes 
 Atomic Minerals Directorate for Exploration and Research
 Administrative Staff College of India
 Bharat Dynamics Limited
 Centre for Cellular and Molecular Biology
 Centre for Development of Advanced Computing
 Centre for DNA Fingerprinting and Diagnostics
 Centre for Economic and Social Studies
 Central Power Research Institute
 Central Institute of Tool Design
 Central Research Institute for Dryland Agriculture
 Central Institute for Medicinal and Aromatic Plants
 Directorate of Rice Research
 Defence Research and Development Organisation
 Advanced Systems Laboratory
 Advanced Numerical Research and Analysis Group
 Research Centre Imarat
 Dr. Marri Channa Reddy Human Resource Development Institute of Telangana
 Footwear Design and Development Institute
 International Crops Research Institute for the Semi-Arid Tropics
 International School of Engineering
 Institute for Development and Research in Banking Technology
 Institute of Public Enterprise
 Indian Institute of Chemical Technology
 Indian Immunologicals Limited
 Institute of Genetics and Hospital for Genetic Diseases
 Indian Statistical Institute
 National Institute of Agricultural Extension Management
 National Institute of Tourism and Hospitality Management
 National Institute of Nutrition
 Nizam's Institute of Medical Sciences
 National Institute of Fashion Technology, Hyderabad

 National Police Academy
 National Academy of Construction
 National Small Industries Corporation
 National Remote Sensing Agency

Private colleges

Engineering

Chaitanya Bharathi Institute of Technology
 CMR Institute of Technology, Hyderabad
 CVR College of Engineering
 CVSR College of Engineering
 Deccan College of Engineering and Technology
 Gokaraju Rangaraju Institute of Engineering Technology
 International School of Engineering
 Institute Of Aeronautical Engineering
 J. B. Institute of Engineering and Technology
 Keshav Memorial Institute of Technology
 Mahatma Gandhi Institute of Technology
 Malla Reddy Engineering College
 Malla Reddy College of Engineering and Technology
 Maturi Venkata Subba Rao Engineering College
 Methodist College of Engineering and Technology
 Muffakham Jah College of Engineering and Technology
 Padmasri Dr. B.V Raju Institute of Technology
 Sreenidhi Institute of Science and Technology
 TRR College of Engineering
Vardhaman College of Engineering
 Vasavi College of Engineering
 Vidya Jyothi Institute of Technology
 Vignan Institute of Technology and Aeronautical Engineering
 Vignana Bharathi Institute of Technology
 VNR Vignana Jyothi Institute of Engineering and Technology

Design
 ICAT Design & Media College, Hyderabad * Footwear Design and Development Institute, Hyderabad *

Medicine
 Deccan College of Medical Sciences
 Kamineni Institute of Medical Sciences
 Nizams Institute of Medical Sciences
 Osmania Medical College
 Shadan Institute of Medical Sciences
Mallareddy Medical College for Women's 
Mallareddy Institute of Medical Sciences
Mallareddy Dental College for Women's
Mallareddy Institute of  Dental Sciences
Panineeya Institute of Dental Sciences

Other degree colleges 
 Andhra Vidyalaya College of Arts, Science and Commerce
 Bhavans Vivekananda College
 City College Hyderabad
 Nizam College
 Tapasya College of Commerce and Management
 Wesley Degree College, Secunderabad
 Avinash College of Commerce
 Loyola Academy Degree And PG College

Schools 
 Jubliee Hills Public School
 Aga Khan Academy
 All Saints High School
 Bharatiya Vidya Bhavan Public School
 D.A.V. Public School
 Dr. S. Hussain Zaheer Memorial High School
 Gitanjali Senior School
 Glendale Academy
 Global Indian International School
 Gowtham Model School
 Hyderabad Public School
 Indus International School
 Johnson Grammar School
 Little Flower High School

 Meridian School
 Nasr School
 Oakridge International School
 Oxford Grammar School
 P Obul Reddy Public School
 Rosary Convent High School
 Sanskriti School
 Sri Aurobindo International School
 Stanley Girls High School
 St. George's Grammar School
 St. Paul's High School
 Vidyaranya High School
 Walden's Path

See also 

 Education in India
 Education in Hyderabad
 List of business schools in Hyderabad, India

References 

 
Education in Hyderabad, India
Hyderabad
Educational institutions